Anton Antonov may refer to:

 Anton Antonov (footballer) (born 1998), Russian football player
 Anton Antonov (water polo) (born 1983), Russian water polo player